Molong is a small town in the Central West region of New South Wales, Australia, in Cabonne Shire.

History

The name Molong comes from the Aboriginal word for 'all rocks'.

William Lee of Kelso is said to have had cattle in the area by 1819. He later held property just north of present Molong, around Larras Lee. In 1826, a military and police outpost was established at Molong, on Governor Darling's orders, as a step in opening up the government stock reserve west of the Macquarie River for settlement. The present village of Molong was officially gazetted in March 1849. In 1845, Copper was discovered at Copper Hill, just north of the town.

The Historical Museum is housed in a former hotel (1856), built by rubble-mason James Mortal, who sold it in 1861 to John Smith of Gamboola.  Smith let the building to a series of publicans and it later became the residence and surgery for a series of doctors.  The Historical Society acquired it for use as a museum, in 1969, with help from the Molong Shire Council.

Heritage listings 
Molong has a number of heritage-listed sites, including:
 Main Western railway: Molong railway station
  SE of Molong Yuranigh Road: Grave of Yuranigh

Geography

At the 2016 census, Molong had a population of 1,674 people. Charles Sturt visited Molong in 1828. Molong was the site of an early copper mine in Australia, located at Copper Hill just outside Molong.

The railway from Sydney reached Molong in 1886; it was later extended to Parkes. A branch railway to Dubbo was opened in 1925 and closed in 1987.

Climate 
Despite Molong's elevation, it still manages to have a humid subtropical climate, bordering on an oceanic climate (Köppen: Cfa/Cfb, Trewartha: Cfbk/Cfak), with warm to hot summers and cool winters.

Education

Molong Central School
St Joseph's Catholic Schools

References

External links 

 Molong on the Orange Town & Around website

 
Towns in New South Wales
Towns in the Central West (New South Wales)
Cabonne Council
Mining towns in New South Wales